Florentius Romanus Protogenes (fl. 448 – 451) was a Roman statesman who served as the Consul in 449.

Bibliography
 Fl. Florentius Romanus Protogenes, PLRE II, Cambridge University Press, 1980, pp. 927–928.

Imperial Roman consuls
5th-century Romans
5th-century Roman consuls